Pratap Manikya (d. 1487) was a Maharaja of Tripura during the late 15th century.

Reign
Though Pratap Manikya is stated in the Rajmala to be a son of Dharma Manikya I, later scholarship proved this to be chronologically improbable. It is instead believed that he was Dharma's grandson, with his father being Ratna Manikya I. There were also uncertainties regarding the years of Pratap's rule. A coin supposedly minted during his reign bears the year Saka 1412 (1490 CE), though the modern-style script has led to doubts regarding its authenticity. It is notable that Pratap's immediate successors struck coins in 1488 and 1489 respectively.

A younger son of his father, Pratap's rule had been propped up by the support of prominent army generals in opposition to his elder brother Dhanya, against whom he waged a civil war. According to the Rajmala, because of his impiety, Pratap soon lost the support of these nobles, who launched a conspiracy against him. The chronicle continues that due to his formidable physical strength and stoutness, Pratap had to be killed at night while he slept. 

He was succeeded in quick succession by the minor Vijaya Manikya (who may have been his son) and Pratap's younger brother Mukut, before the throne finally settled on Dhanya, whose long reign lasted until 1515.

Notes

References

Kings of Tripura
History of Tripura